The EFA League Cup, currently known as the WE League Cup for sponsorship reasons, is an annual knockout football competition for Egyptian Premier League clubs.

Trophies for EFA League CUP winners are made by London-based silversmiths Thomas Lyte.

Finals

See also
 
 Egyptian League Cup

References 

Football cup competitions in Egypt